This is a list of mountain tops and ranges in Greece and around the world that have a Greek name.